Kucura is a village in Serbia, in the Autonomous Province of Vojvodina. It is located in the municipality of Vrbas, in the South Bačka District. The village is ethnically mixed and has a population of 4,663 (2002 census).

Ethnic groups

1971
According to the 1971 census, ethnic Rusyns comprised 60% of the population of the village.

2002
According to the 2002 census, the population of the village include:
 2,200 (47.18%) Rusyns
 1,808 (38.77%) Serbs
 352 (7.55%) Hungarians
 others.

Historical population

1961: 4,881
1971: 4,655
1981: 4,687
1991: 4,713

Notable residents
Ljubomir Fejsa

Gallery

See also
List of places in Serbia
List of cities, towns and villages in Vojvodina

References
Slobodan Ćurčić, Broj stanovnika Vojvodine, Novi Sad, 1996.

External links 

KucuraOnline
Kucura location map

Places in Bačka
South Bačka District
Pannonian Rusyns